Peter Paul is a male double name honouring Saints Peter and Paul. It may be treated as a single given name or as a first-name middle-name combination (in which case the bearer may go by a form of "Peter" — or "Paul" — rather than the double name). The corresponding name day is 29 June, the Feast of Saints Peter and Paul. The equivalent name in other languages is likewise a juxtaposition of the equivalents of the names Peter and Paul; in some languages the pair may be hyphenated (as French Pierre-Paul) or written solid (as Italian Pierpaolo; Pier Paolo and Pietro Paolo are also found in Italian). 

People with the name(s) include:
 Peter Paul Althaus (1892–1965), German poet.
 Peter Paul Toney Babey or Peter Bobbeie (fl. 1849–1855), Mi'kmaw chief in Nova Scotia.
 Peter Paul Benazech (1744?–1783?), English engraver.
 Peter Paul Bergman (1939–2012), American writer and comedian.
 Peter Paul Borg (1843–1934), Maltese theologian.
 Peter Paul Brang (1852–1925), Viennese architect.
 Peter Paul Brauer (1899–1959), German film producer and director.
 Peter Paul Brennan (1941–2016), American Old Catholic bishop.
 Peter Paul Busuttil (1942/3–2017), mayor of Hal Safi, Malta.
 Peter Paul Montgomery Buttigieg (born 1982), American politician.
 Peter Paul Cetera (born 1944), American singer, songwriter, and bassist best known for being an original member of the rock band Chicago.
 Peter Paul Francis Degrand or P.P.F. Degrand (1787–1855) French-born broker and merchant in Massachusetts, U.S.
 Peter Paul Dobree (1782–1825), English classical scholar and critic.
 Peter Paul Felner (1884–1927), Austrian-Hungarian screenwriter and film director.
 Peter Paul Fernandes (1916–1981), Indian field hockey player.
 Peter Paul Fuchs (1916–2007), Austrian-born, U.S.-based conductor and composer.
 Peter Paul Gillen (1858–1896), South Australian storekeeper and Aboriginal rights activist.
 Peter Paul Gomez, (fl. 1955) Pakistani MP for East Bengal.
 Peter Paul Halajian  (1864–1927), Armenian-American founder of Peter Paul Candy.
 Peter Paul Koprowski (born 1947), Polish-Canadian composer.
 Peter Paul Labertouche (1829–1907), British engineer and public servant in Melbourne, Australia.
 Peter Paul Lefevere (1804–1869), Belgian-American Catholic bishop.
 Peter Paul Mahoney (1848–1889), U.S. Representative from New York.
 Peter Paul Marshall (1830–1900), Scottish engineer and co-founder of the decorative arts firm Morris, Marshall, Faulkner.
 Peter Paul Mauser (1838–1914), German weapon designer and industrialist.
 Peter Paul Muller (born 1965), Dutch actor.
 Peter Paul Odhiambo (born 1937), Ugandan boxer at the 1964 Summer Olympics.
 Peter Paul Pillai (fl. 1885–1901), Indian National Congress representative for Tirunelveli.
 Peter Paul Prabhu (1931−2013), Indian Roman Catholic archbishop and diplomat.
 Peter Paul Pugin (1851–1904), English architect.
 Peter Paul Rubens (1577–1640), Flemish Baroque painter
 Peter Paul Saldanha (born 1964), Catholic bishop of Mangalore, India.
 Peter Paul Maria Alberdingk Thijm (1827–1904), Dutch academic and writer.
 Peter Paul Wiplinger (born 1939), Austrian writer and photographer.
 Peter Paul Wyngarde (1927–2018), British actor in television series Department S (1969–70) and Jason King (1971–72).

Fictional characters include:
 Peter Paul Gualtieri, known as "Paulie Walnuts", portrayed by Tony Sirico on the HBO series The Sopranos

See also
 All pages with titles beginning with: ; ; ; ; ; ; ; ; 
 Peter Paul (disambiguation)
 Peter and Paul (disambiguation)

English-language masculine given names
Saints Peter and Paul
Compound given names